Conoy Creek is an  tributary of the Susquehanna River in Lancaster County, Pennsylvania in the United States.

The headwaters of the creek pass through the borough of Elizabethtown, heading southwest. Conoy Creek joins the Susquehanna River at Bainbridge.

See also
List of rivers of Pennsylvania

References

Rivers of Lancaster County, Pennsylvania
Rivers of Pennsylvania
Tributaries of the Susquehanna River